Åke Wärnström (29 December 1925 – 6 June 2018) was a Swedish boxer who competed in the 1952 Summer Olympics. Wärnström died in June 2018 at the age of 92.

References

1925 births
2018 deaths
Boxers at the 1952 Summer Olympics
Olympic boxers of Sweden
Swedish male boxers
Featherweight boxers
20th-century Swedish people